Bangalore Stadium may refer to any of the three stadiums located in Bangalore, India:

 Sree Kanteerava Stadium, a multi-purpose stadium
 Chinnaswamy Stadium, a cricket stadium
 Bangalore Football Stadium